American Spring is the tenth studio album by American punk rock band Anti-Flag from Pittsburgh, Pennsylvania. It was released on May 26, 2015 via Spinefarm Records, making it their first record released through the label (their previous two albums were dropped via SideOneDummy Records). The fourteen-track record featured guest appearances from Tim Armstrong of Rancid on the song "Bradenburg Gate" and Tom Morello of Rage Against the Machine on the song "Without End". The album debuted at #22 on the Top Rock Albums, #17 on the Alternative Albums, #5 on the Hard Rock Albums, and #15 on the Independent Albums.

A lyric music video for the album's first single, "Fabled World" was released in March 2015. The second single "Sky Is Falling" was released a month later. A music video for "Brandenburg Gate" was released on May 19.

Track listing

Personnel 
 Justin Sane – guitar, vocals, producer
 Chris Head – guitar, vocals, producer
 Chris #2 – bass, vocals, producer
 Pat Thetic – drums, producer
 Tim Armstrong – additional vocals on "Brandenburg Gate"
 Tom Morello – additional guitar on "Without End"
 Jim Kaufman – tambourine, producer
 Kenny Carkeet – producer
 Mass Giorgini – mastering
 Ryan Hewitt – mixing
 Doug Dean – artwork & design

Charts

References

External links 

2015 albums
Anti-Flag albums